Anna Leahy is an American poet and nonfiction writer. The author of numerous books of poetry, essays, and creative writing pedagogy, Leahy directs the Tabula Poetica Center for Poetry and MFA in Creative Writing program at Chapman University in Orange, California. In 2013, she was named editor of TAB: The Journal of Poetry & Poetics.

Career
Leahy's poetry and nonfiction have won citations for their “lucid and beautiful consideration of what is means at the physical level to be human and to be whole.” Her first chapbook Hagioscope won the Sow's Ear Press Competition in 2000, and her first full-length, Constituents of Matter won the Wick Poetry Prize from Kent State University in 2006. In 2016, her essays won top prizes from both Ninth Letter and Dogwood, and have been listed among the Notables in The Best American Essays of 2013, 2016, and 2017.

Leahy's poetry draws from concepts and terminology of science. Constituents of Matter was reviewed favorably in The Women's Review of Books among others, citing the effective use of scientific and logical systems such as game theory and the scientific method as “metaphors and models to characterize what is unseen”. Aperture, Deborah Hauser writes, is “five tightly structured sections and a coda [which] shine a spotlight on the lives of women as diverse as the mothers left behind in The Wizard of Oz, Mary Todd Lincoln, Lizzie Siddal (photographer’s model), and Katherine Johnson (NASA mathematician).” Eileen Murphy contends the "poems are varied, thoughtful, and often ironic or humorous . . . the reader looks through the mind-opening with the poet as guide, listens to unique women’s voices, revels in them, learns from them, is haunted by them."

Leahy's nonfiction books include Tumor in the Object Lessons series from Bloomsbury Publishing, and Conversing with Cancer with Lisa Sparks. From 2010 to 2017, she co-authored a blog with Douglas R. Dechow, Lofty Ambitions, about aviation and space, which culminated in a visiting fellowship at the American Library in Paris in fall 2016 and Generation Space: A Love Story, which follows the end of the Space Shuttle program.

In 2016, she edited and co-wrote What We Talk about When We Talk about Creative Writing, a collaborative exploration of teaching and academia with 32 contributors in more than a dozen conversation essays. In 2005, she edited Power and Identity in the Creative Writing Classroom, which was reviewed by Pedagogy in terms of creating a new paradigm for teaching creative writing at the college and university level. The reviewer found that by examining new ways to teach as presented in Leahy's book, creative writing professors can make better decisions about their own classrooms. In 2010, Leahy contributed to Does the Writing Workshop Still Work?, which was reviewed by Pedagogy and called "an enlightening read for both critics and supporters of the workshop." Her essays on teaching creative writing are included in Hippo Reads and The Handbook of Creative Writing, as well as critical work for Curator, The Journal of the Midwest MLA, The Journal of Creative Writing Studies, The Companion to the American Short Story, and the Encyclopedia of American Poetry: The Twentieth Century.

A native of Illinois, Leahy is the daughter of Mary Lee Leahy, whom the Chicago Tribune called "a pioneering lawyer," and Andrew Leahy. She holds an MA from Iowa State University, MFA in Poetry from the University of Maryland, and PhD from Ohio University.

Work
Leahy's essays and poetry have appeared in 2Paragraphs, Air & Space Magazine, Airplane Reading, ArLiJo, The Atlantic, Barn Owl Review, Bellevue Literary Review, Coast Magazine, Crab Orchard Review, Dogwood, Drunken Boat, Dunes Review, Eclipse, Entropy, Fifth Wednesday Journal, The Huffington Post, Image, The Journal, Literary Hub, Literary Orphans, Minerva Rising, Motto, Nimrod, Ninth Letter, Oberon, OC Register, OZY, Parade, Passage North, Poets & Writers, PopSugar, Quarterly West, The Rumpus, Southern Humanities Review, South Florida Poetry, The Southern Review, Tinderbox, The Weeklings, Willawaw, 
and Zocalo Public Square, among others.

Nonfiction

Pedagogy

Poetry

Scholarship

References

Chapman University faculty
Living people
American women poets
American bloggers
21st-century American poets
Poets from Illinois
Iowa State University alumni
University of Maryland, College Park alumni
Ohio University alumni
21st-century American women writers
HuffPost writers and columnists
American women non-fiction writers
20th-century American non-fiction writers
American women columnists
Year of birth missing (living people)